AirHelp is a claims management company that promotes and enforces air passenger rights in cases of flight disruptions globally. Its online service helps air passengers get compensation from airlines when their flight gets canceled, delayed, or overbooked. AirHelp is also known for publishing annual rankings of airports and airlines.

The company was founded by Henrik Zillmer, Nicolas Michaelsen and Greg Roodt in 2013. Its operation is mainly based on European Regulation No 261/2004 under which passengers in the EU are entitled to compensation in the event of denied boarding, cancellation, or a long delay of flights. Since 2020, AirHelp has broadened its service and supports passengers in Europe, US, Canada, Brazil, Turkey and Asia.

Services 
AirHelp also helps passengers under the clauses of Regulation (EC) No. 261/2004 and other local Air Passenger Rights regulations, such as UK261 in UK, ANAC 400 in Brazil, Air Passenger Protection Regulations in Canada and Turkey, and Montreal Convention in US. It determines the eligibility of individual travelers through a web form and an app for Android and iOS devices.

The initial assessment of cases is offered as a free service. If the firm considers that users are entitled to compensation, users may commission the company to pursue their claim in exchange for a success-based fee. AirHelp has reportedly helped over 10 million passengers globally.

In cases in which an airline rejects an out-of-court settlement, AirHelp, together with its partners, takes legal action. On several occasions, this activity has prompted courts to clarify previously disputed legal questions regarding passenger rights.

To substantiate claims against airlines, AirHelp compiles information from multiple databases to reconstruct the circumstances of flight disruptions in question. The company's former CEO Zillmer states that their use of AI technology enables the company to cross-check passengers' eligibility for compensation against the excuse of weather conditions that airlines often use to reject claims. The company's co-founder Nicolas Michaelsen has also stated that airlines have to offer proof when flights are disrupted due to weather.

In February 2019, the company added two new bots to their existing bots "Herman" and "Lara": the new bot dubbed "AgA" reviews all claims coming into the AirHelp website and app, whereas the other bot "Docky" automatically requests additional travel documentation that may be needed for a decision to be reached.

Criticism
The company has been criticized for a lack of transparency regarding its collaborations with travel agencies and for openly stating that it treats flight disruptions as business opportunities to attract partnerships. In response to the accusation that AirHelp and other companies in the field of flight compensation management are making a business out of something that a traveler is entitled to for free, its former CEO Henrik Zillmer has said that airlines make it difficult for passengers to know their rights and claim for compensation.

Although most passengers seem to be satisfied with AirHelp's services, some aviation authorities have warned it may lead to fare increases.

Claiming process, depending on an airline, can take weeks and even months and years with some airlines. This is out of AirHelp control, but the company invests in the lengthy and expensive process without upfront fees. However, AirHelp's policy of emailing travelers monthly claiming that their request is on the right track before finally announcing that their case has been closed unsuccessfully after failing to reach an agreement with an airline, or due to new evidence proving not an airline fault for disruption, has also brought discredit on the company.

Global rankings 

Each year since 2015 AirHelp produces a global report of airport and airline rankings. The airports are ranked according to on-time performance (60%), service quality (20%) and food & shops (20%), while airlines are ranked to on-time performance, service quality and claim processing with each category weighted equally. AirHelp utilizes its own databases, commercial vendors and passenger surveys to compile the necessary data for their reports. On the basis of their AirHelp Score, Bloomberg News has reported on the best and worst airlines and airports in the world for the years 2018 and 2019. AirHelp rankings have also been used in articles by a number of other media outlets, such as MSN and Forbes.

See also 

 Claims management
 Flight cancellation and delay
 Airhelp Opiniones

References

External links 

 AirHelp official website

Law firms established in 2013